This is a list of films set in Las Vegas.

See also

 List of films shot in Las Vegas
 List of television shows set in Las Vegas

References

Las Vegas
 
Films